In medieval and early modern Europe, a tenant-in-chief  (or vassal-in-chief) was a person who held his lands under various forms of feudal land tenure directly from the king or territorial prince to whom he did homage, as opposed to holding them from another nobleman or senior member of the clergy. The tenure was one which denoted great honour, but also carried heavy responsibilities. The tenants-in-chief were originally responsible for providing knights and soldiers for the king's feudal army.

Terminology
The Latin term was tenens in capite.

Other names for tenant-in-chief were "captal" or baron, although the latter term evolved in meaning. For example, the term "baron" was used in the Cartae Baronum of 1166, a return of all tenants-in-chief in England. At that time the term was understood to mean the "king's barons", or "king's men", because baron could still have a broader meaning. Originally, for example in Domesday Book (1086), there was a small number of powerful English tenants-in-chief under the Norman king who were all magnates directly associated with the king.

Later, as laid-out by I. J. Sanders, the old tenancies-in-chief of England from the time of the Norman king, King Henry I of England, came to have a legally distinct form of feudal land holding, the so-called tenure per baroniam. The term "baron" thus came to be used mainly for these "feudal barons", which comprised a group that over-lapped with the tenancies-in-chief, but was not identical.

History
In most countries allodial property could be held by laypeople or the Christian Church. However, in the Kingdom of England after the Norman Conquest, the king became in law the sole lord paramount and only holder of land by allodial title. Thus all the lands in England became the property of the Crown. A tenure by frankalmoin, which in other countries was regarded as a form of privileged allodial holding, was in England regarded as a feudal tenement.  Every land-holding was deemed by feudal custom to be no more than an estate in land, whether directly or indirectly held of the king.  Absolute title in land could only be held by the king himself, the most anyone else could hold was a right over land, not a title in land per se. In England, a tenant-in-chief could enfief, or grant fiefs carved out of his own holding, to his own followers. The creation of subfiefs under a tenant-in-chief or other fief-holder was known as subinfeudation. The kings of the House of Normandy, however, eventually imposed on all free men who occupied a tenement (i.e. those whose tenures were "freehold", that is to say for life or heritable by their heirs), a duty of fealty to the crown rather than to their immediate lord who had enfeoffed them. This was to diminish the possibility of sub-vassals being employed by tenants-in-chief against the crown.

In the great feudal survey Domesday Book (1086), tenants-in-chief were listed first in each English county's entry. The lands held by a tenant-in-chief in England, if comprising a large feudal barony, were called an honour.

Duties of tenants-in-chief
As feudal lord, the king had the right to collect scutage from the barons who held these honours. Scutage (literally shield money, from escutcheon) was a tax collected from vassals in lieu of military service. The payment of scutage rendered the crown more independent of the feudal levy and enabled it to pay for troops on its own. Once a tenant-in-chief received a demand for scutage, the cost was passed on to the sub-tenants and thus came to be regarded as a universal land tax. This tax was a development from the taxation system created under the Anglo-Saxon kings to raise money to pay off the invading Danes, the so-called Danegeld.

Heirs
When an English tenant-in-chief died, an inquisition post mortem was held in each county in which he held land and his or her land temporarily escheated (i.e. reverted) to the demesne of the crown until the heir paid a sum of money (a relief), and was then able to take possession (livery of seisin) of the lands. However, if the heir was underage (under 21 for a male heir, under 14 for an heiress) they would be subject to a feudal wardship where the custody of their lands and the right to arrange their marriage passed to the monarch, until they came of age. The wardship and marriage was not usually kept in Crown hands, but was sold, often simply to the highest bidder, unless outbid by the next of kin.

When an heir came of age, he or she passed out of wardship but could not enter upon their inheritance until, like all heirs of full age on inheritance, they had sued out their livery. In either case, the process was complicated. Eventually a warrant was issued for the livery to pass under the Great Seal. From its inception in 1540, The Court of Wards and Liveries administered the funds received from the wardships, marriages and the granting of livery; both courts and practice were abolished in 1646 and the whole system of feudal tenure – except for fee simple – was abolished by the Tenures Abolition Act 1660.

See also

 Lord paramount, mesne lord, & overlord
 Imperial immediacy
 Fee simple
 English Feudal Baronies
 History of the English fiscal system

Notes

Citations

Sources

Further reading

 

1660 disestablishments in England
Medieval economics
Noble titles
Political history
Titles in the United Kingdom
Scots law legal terminology
Land tenure
Barons